Waldsee may refer to:

Waldsee, Palatinate, a municipality in Rhineland-Palatinate, Germany
Bad Waldsee, a town in Baden-Württemberg, Germany
Waldsee (camp), a German language summer camp in Minnesota, US

See also
Lords of Walsee